Champion Air was an airline based in Bloomington, Minnesota, USA. It operated general charter services to sports teams, vacation wholesalers, and government agencies. It also offered limited scheduled service. Its main base was Minneapolis-Saint Paul International Airport, with hubs at Denver International Airport, Dallas/Fort Worth International Airport, Detroit Metropolitan Wayne County Airport, McCarran International Airport in Las Vegas, Lambert-St. Louis International Airport, and Will Rogers World Airport in Oklahoma City. The airline ceased all operations on May 31, 2008. Until its shutdown, the airline was a prime contractor for the Justice Prisoner and Alien Transportation System.

History 

In 1987, MGM Grand Air , a charter airline owned by MGM Grand, Inc, with a focus on operating VIP charters with luxurious aircraft, was established, starting operations in September 1987. Operating Douglas DC-8 and Boeing 727 aircraft in lavish configurations, MGM Grand Air operated charter service as well as scheduled service between Los Angeles International Airport and John F. Kennedy International Airport in New York using aircraft with an all premium seating configuration. MGM Grand had its headquarters in El Segundo, California.

By 1994, with business jets gaining popularity with celebrities and business leaders, MGM Grand Air was no longer profitable, and the company sought to sell it off. The buyer was Front Page Tours, a small tour operator based in Edina, Minnesota dedicated to providing airlift to sports teams and their fans to major sporting events. The air operator's certificate was purchased from MGM Grand Air in July 1995. The name was changed to Champion Air and the fleet was standardized on the Boeing 727.

In March 1997, Minnesota Twins owner Carl Pohlad and Northwest Airlines acquired the company from Richard Page. The airline relocated to Minneapolis, Minnesota, where it shared facilities and resources with Northwest. Champion Air replaced Sun Country Airlines as the leading charter operator for Northwest-owned MLT Vacations. In 2003, five Champion Air executives supposedly completed a management buy-out to take control of the airline. This was a facade created to prevent the higher-cost NWA pilots and union from forcing the group to shifting the flying to NWA's union pilots.  The airline continued to operate both VIP and general charters for MLT and other operators.  Champion Air continued to be run behind the scenes by Northwest executives, including an all-NWA board of directors.

However, in late summer 2007 Champion Air management was informed that MLT passengers would be moved from Champion Air to Northwest's own flights throughout the 2008 year. This was a significant blow, as MLT Vacations accounted for roughly 75-80 percent of all operations. In January 2008, it was disclosed that Champion's contract to provide charter flights for 13 National Basketball Association teams would also be taken over by Northwest, who had hired several Champion Air pilots in the preceding months.

On March 31, 2008, Champion President and CEO Lee Steele announced that "the company will cease all flight operations as of May 31, 2008."  He cited high fuel costs and the inefficiency of their aging Boeing 727-200 fleet as some of the major reasons behind the shutdown. "Our business model is no longer viable in a world of $110 oil, a struggling economy and rapidly changing demand for our services" The carrier will not be filing bankruptcy.

The airline was wholly owned by Champion Air Management and had 737 employees as of January 2005.

Fleet 

As of March 2007 the Champion Air fleet included:

6 Boeing 727-200 Advanced aircraft equipped with 56 Business Class Seating
10 Boeing 727-200 Advanced aircraft equipped with all Coach Class Seating

In popular culture 
An ex Champion Air 727-200 N293AS (known as N293AS during Champion Air ownership) was used in the Channel 4 (UK) / Discovery Channel (USA) experiment where the aircraft was crashed on a dried lake in Northern Mexico.

See also 
 List of defunct airlines of the United States

References

External links
 

Defunct airlines of the United States
Companies based in Bloomington, Minnesota
Airlines established in 1995
Airlines disestablished in 2008
Defunct companies based in Minnesota
1995 establishments in Minnesota
2008 disestablishments in Minnesota